Vanuatu competed in the Olympic Games for the first time at the 1988 Summer Olympics in Seoul, South Korea.

Competitors
The following is the list of number of competitors in the Games.

Athletics

Track events
Men

Women

Boxing

Iahuat's contest was stopped in the first round after 1 minute 13 seconds due to a head blow.
Paululum was disqualified for being a pound overweight due to having a breakfast before the weigh-in.

References

Official Olympic Reports

Nations at the 1988 Summer Olympics
1988
1988 in Vanuatuan sport